Marcello Troisi Moreira (born 9 March 1976) is a Brazilian retired footballer who played as a striker, and the current coach of Turbina in the Kategoria e Parë.

Career
After playing for Santos, Corinthians and Remo in his home country, Troisi moved abroad where he played in Greece.

References

1976 births
Living people
Brazilian footballers
Association football forwards
Campeonato Brasileiro Série A players
Santos FC players
Sport Club Corinthians Paulista players
Athlitiki Enosi Larissa F.C. players
PAOK FC players
Oriente Petrolero players
Sampaio Corrêa Futebol Clube players
Sociedade Esportiva Matonense players
Piauí Esporte Clube players
Democrata Futebol Clube players
Campeonato Brasileiro Série C players
São Bernardo Futebol Clube players
Parnahyba Sport Club players
Brazilian football managers
Associação Desportiva Cabofriense managers
FK Kukësi managers
KF Laçi managers
KF Bylis Ballsh managers
Flamurtari Vlorë managers
Kategoria Superiore managers
Brazilian expatriate football managers
Expatriate football managers in Albania
Brazilian expatriate sportspeople in Albania
União Esporte Clube players
Sportspeople from Santos, São Paulo